Coloneşti may refer to several places in Romania:

 Coloneşti, a commune in Bacău County
 Coloneşti, a commune in Olt County